"Hot Rod Lincoln" is a song by American singer-songwriter Charlie Ryan, first released in 1955. It was written as an answer song to Arkie Shibley's 1950 hit "Hot Rod Race" (US #29).

It describes a drive north on  US Route 99 (predecessor to Interstate 5) from San Pedro, Los Angeles, and over the Grapevine which soon becomes a hot rod race that ends with serious consequences.

Song details
The car race is described between two hot rod cars, the narrator's Ford Model A (with a Lincoln motor) and a Cadillac. The song says the Ford's "got 12 cylinders" overdrive, a four-barrel carburetor, 4.11:1 gear ratio, and safety tubes. The narrator ends up being arrested by the police for his high-speed driving and describes the exasperation of his father: "He said, 'Son, you're gonna drive me to drinkin' / If you don't quit drivin' that hot rod Lincoln!'"

Ryan's original rockabilly version of the song was released in 1955 through Souvenir Records under the artist name Charley Ryan and the Livingston Bros. A second version was released in 1959 through Four Star Records, credited to Charlie Ryan and the Timberline Riders. Ryan based the description of the eponymous car on his own hot rod, built from a 1948 12-cylinder Lincoln chassis shortened two feet, with a 1930 Ford Model A body fitted to it. Ryan raced his hot rod against a Cadillac sedan driven by a friend in Lewiston, Idaho, driving up the Spiral Highway (former U.S. Route 95 in Idaho) to the top of Lewiston Hill. Some say he incorporated elements from this race in his lyrics to "Hot Rod Lincoln", but changed the setting to Grapevine Hill (a long, nearly straight grade up Grapevine Canyon to Tejon Pass, near the town of Gorman, California) to fit it within the narrative of "Hot Rod Race".

Johnny Bond version
Another version of "Hot Rod Lincoln" was recorded by country musician Johnny Bond and released in 1960 through Republic Records, with Bond's lyrics changing the hot rod's engine from a V12 to a V8., among other changes. It reached number 26 on the Billboard Hot 100 in August 1960.  Bond released a sequel in the same year called "X-15", set in 1997, about an air race in an X-15 plane.

Commander Cody version
A 1971 version, by country rock band Commander Cody and His Lost Planet Airmen on their album Lost in the Ozone, became the most successful version of "Hot Rod Lincoln", reaching No. 9 on the Billboard Hot 100, No. 28 Adult Contemporary, No. 7 in Canada, and was ranked No. 69 on the U.S. Billboard Year-End Hot 100 singles of 1972. The song peaked at number 45 in Australia. This version maintained most of the lyrical changes from Johnny Bond's version but changed them further while maintaining the original story.

Chart history

Weekly charts
Charlie Ryan

Johnny Bond

Commander Cody

Year-end charts

Other versions 
In addition to Johnny Bond and Commander Cody and His Lost Planet Airmen, many other artists have recorded "Hot Rod Lincoln" in the decades since its original release, including:
Pat Travers, on Pat Travers (1976)
Asleep at the Wheel, on Western Standard Time (1988); this version reached no. 65 on Billboard's Hot Country Songs
All, on Allroy's Revenge (1989)
Jim Varney, on The Beverly Hillbillies soundtrack (1993)
Les Claypool, on Crank It Up (2002)
Roger Miller, on A Man Like Me: The Early Years of Roger Miller (2006)
Lawrence Ramsay, on Blowin' Cash (2010)
Chris Casello, on Chris Casello Trio (2013)
Bill Kirchen (lead guitar in Commander Cody and His Lost Planet Airmen) on Hot Rod Lincoln Live (1997)
George Thorogood & the Destroyers

References

External links
Rockabilly Hall of Fame — Documents the history of the song through dozens of covers, including lyrics.
www.hot-rod-lincoln.com — The official site of Charlie Ryan

Rockabilly songs
1955 songs
1955 singles
1972 singles
Asleep at the Wheel songs
Charlie Ryan songs
Commander Cody and His Lost Planet Airmen songs
Johnny Bond songs
Songs about cars
Answer songs
Lincoln Motor Company
Paramount Records singles